Cuscuta epithymum (dodder, lesser dodder, hellweed, strangle-tare) is a parasitic plant assigned to the family Cuscutaceae or Convolvulaceae, depending on the taxonomy. It is red-pigmented, not being photosynthetically active. It has a filiform habit, like a group of yarns. Its leaves are very small, like flakes. Its flowers, disposed in little glomerules, have a white corolla, with the androecium welded to the corolla.

In Eurasia, this species of dodder would often attach itself to the Conehead thyme (Thymus capitatus), taking on the plant's pungency and from whence it also derived its host's Arabic name, al-ṣaʿitrah. During medieval times, dodder was often used as a medicinal cure in treating depression, but causes thirst and dryness of the mouth when consumed.

References

External links
 
 

epithymum
Taxa named by Carl Linnaeus